Numbugga, New South Wales, Australia, is a locality about 15 km from the town of Bega, in Bega Valley Shire, consisting of mainly farmland, rural residential dwellings and National Parks.

History
Numbugga was settled around the same times as the nearby towns of Bega and Bemboka.  The present route of the Snowy Mountains Highway follows the old route, except for a few deviations that are now roads in their own right, such as Coopers Gully Road and Garfield Road.  The area used to  have three schools until the mid-1970s.  A hall used to stand close to the location of the current Numbugga Bushfire Brigade shed.  The Numbugga Bushfire Brigade is part of the NSW RFS

Photo gallery

Notes and references

Towns in New South Wales
Bega Valley Shire